A scimitar ( or ) is a single-edged sword with a convex curved blade associated with Middle Eastern, South Asian, or North African cultures. A European term, scimitar does not refer to one specific sword type, but an assortment of different Eastern curved swords inspired by types introduced to the Middle East by Central Asian ghilmans. These swords include the Persian shamshir (the origin of the word scimitar), the Arab saif, the Indian talwar, the North African nimcha, and the Turkish kilij. All such swords are originally derived from earlier curved swords developed in Turkic Central Asia (Turkestan).

Etymology 
The English term scimitar is attested from the mid-16th century and derives from either the Middle French cimeterre (15th century) or from the Italian scimitarra. The ultimate source of these terms is corruptions of the Persian shamshir. Scimitar became used to describe all curved oriental blades, in contrast to the straight and double edged European swords of the time.

The term  saif in Arabic can refer to any Middle Eastern (or North African, South Asian) sword, straight or curved. Saif cognates with the ancient Greek xiphos, which may have been borrowed from a Semitic language, as both saif and xiphos go back to an old (Bronze Age) wanderwort of the eastern Mediterranean of unknown ultimate origin. Richard F. Burton derives both words from the Egyptian sfet.

History of use 

The earliest evidence of scimitars is from the 9th century among soldiers in Khurasan. They were used in horse warfare because of their relatively light weight when compared to larger swords and their curved design, good for slashing opponents while riding on a horse. Nomadic horsemen learned from experience that a curved edge is better for cutting strikes because the arc of the blade matches that of the sweep of the rider's arm as they slash the target while galloping. Mongols, Rajputs and Sikhs used scimitars in warfare, among many other peoples.

The scimitar was widespread throughout the Middle East from at least the Ottoman period until the age of smokeless powder firearms relegated swords to dress and ceremonial function. The Egyptian khopesh, brought to Egypt by the Hyksos, resembled scimitars. The khopesh is sometimes considered a scimitar. Early swords in Islamic lands were typically straight and double edged, following the tradition of the weapons used by the Islamic prophet Muhammad. Though the famous double edged sword, Zulfiqar wielded by Ali was of a curved design, the curved design was probably introduced into central Islamic lands by Turkic warriors from central Asia who were employed as royal body-guards in the 9th century and an Abbasid era blade has been discovered from Khurasan. These Turkic warriors sported an early type of sabre which had been used in central Asia since the 7th century, but failed to gain wider appeal initially in Islamic lands. There is a single surviving Seljuk saber from approximately the year 1200, which may indicate that under that empire curved blades saw some popularity. Following the Mongol invasions of the 13th century the curved swords favored by the Turkic cavalry, formed lasting impacts across much of the Middle East. The adoption of these swords was incremental, starting not long after Mongol conquest, and lasting well into the 15th century. During Islamization of the Turks, the kilij became more and more popular in the Islamic armies. When the Seljuk Empire invaded Persia and became the first Turkic Muslim political power in Western Asia, kilij became the dominant sword form. The Iranian shamshir was created during the Turkic Seljuk Empire period of Iran.

Symbolism

The scimitar has been a symbol since ancient times. To the Akkadians, the scimitar, or harpe, was represented in art as something held by kings and the goddess Ishtar. In the Old Babylonian period, art depicts gods such as Marduk, Ishtar, Ninurta, and Nergal holding scimitars as a symbol of royalty. A common scene depicted in this period is a king or a god trampling on an enemy, a scimitar in their left hand.

The sword (or saif) is an important symbol in Arab cultures, and is used as a metaphor in many phrases in the Arabic language.

The word occurs also in various symbolic and status titles in Arabic (and adopted in other languages) used in Islamic states, notably:
 In the Yemenite independent imamate:
 Saif al-Haqq, meaning "Sword of Truth".
 Saif al-Islam "Sword of submission to Allah" or "Sword of Islam", was a subsidiary title borne (after their name and patronym) by male members of the al-Qasimi dynasty (whose primary title, before the name, was Amir), especially sons of the ruling Imam.
 Sayf al-Dawla and variations mean "Sword of the State".
 Saif Ullah Al-masloul the "drawn sword of God" was conferred by Muhammad, uniquely, to the recent convert and military commander Khalid ibn al-Walid. 
 Saif ul-Mulk "sword of the realm" was an honorary title awarded by the Mughal Padshahs of Hind (India), e.g. as one of the personal titles (including Nawab bahadur, one rank above his dynasty's) conferred in 1658 by the Mughal emperor Aurangzeb to Nawab Muhammad Bayazid Khan Bahadur, a high mansabdar, whose jagir of Malerkotla was by sanad raised to Imperial riyasat, thus becoming an independent ruler.
 Saif ul-Ali, "Sword of Ali", referring to arguably most famous sword in Islamic history, belonging to both Muhammad, and later, Ali, Zulfikar, and with which Ali slew a Makkan foot soldier, cleaving both his helmet and head, at the Battle of Uhud, and with which he (Ali) slew Amr, a ferocious and devastating Makkan soldier at the Battle of the Trench at Madinah.

Saif and Saif al Din "Sword of the religion" are also common masculine (and male) Islamic names.

The scimitar appears as a symbol of the Russians in the Finnish coat of arms of the Province of Karelia, which depicts two armored arms fighting with swords - one Western and one Eastern, representing Karelia's troubled history as a border region between the east and the west. From this context, the sword and scimitar have found their way into the coat of arms of Finland, which depicts a lion brandishing a sword and trampling a scimitar.

In Islamophobia: Making Muslims the Enemy, Peter Gottschalk and Gabriel Greenberg argue that the scimitar has been appropriated by Western culture and Hollywood to symbolize Arab Muslims in a negative light. Even though Muslims used straight-edge swords for the first two centuries of the Crusades, European Christians may have more closely tied the Christian cross-like shape of the swords to their cause. The authors commented that American cartoonists use the scimitar to symbolize "Muslim barbarity", despite the irony in scimitars being worn with some American military uniforms.

In European art

In Shakespeare's works, the scimitar was a symbol for the East and the Islamic world.

Scimitars were used in 19th century orientalist depictions of Middle Eastern men. In the 20th century, they were often used to indicate that a character was Middle Eastern and occupying a villain role.

In media
 Scimitars were weapons used by Aladdin on the 1992 film.
 A scimitar was used by Morgan Freeman when playing Azeem Edin Bashir Al-Bakir, the Moorish ally to the title character of Robin Hood: Prince of Thieves.
 Scimitars were used by warriors and royalty from Calormen on The Chronicles of Narnia such as The Horse and his Boy and The Last Battle.

Notes

References

Citations

Bibliography
 
 
 
 
 
 
 
 

Middle Eastern swords
Single-edged swords
Blade weapons
Weapons of the Ottoman Empire